Petr Zyl (born 7 April 1994) is a Belarusian professional footballer who plays for Viktoriya Maryina Gorka.

On 6 August 2020, the BFF banned Zyl from Belarusian football for 2 years for his involvement in the match fixing.

References

External links 
 
 

1994 births
Living people
Belarusian footballers
Association football defenders
FC Dinamo Minsk players
FC Bereza-2010 players
FC Energetik-BGU Minsk players
FC Dnepr Mogilev players
FC Lida players
FC Oshmyany players
FC Viktoryja Marjina Horka players